Kevin Mark Clarke (born March 21, 1964) is a Canadian former educator, activist and perennial candidate who is the founder and former leader of The People's Political Party. He is considered one of the most recognizable homeless persons in the city of Toronto, campaigning on "the people's rights."

Clarke advocates for comprehensive reform in the criminal justice system, to create a system that prevents recidivism among first-time offenders. He has proposed a program that he claims would reduce the recidivism which allegedly violent prison environments create: 'The Inmate Monitored Education System' otherwise known as T.I.M.E., which would aim to help eliminate the claimed harmful influence of prison life on first-time offenders.

He also campaigns strongly on the issues of poverty and homelessness.

A former student teacher for Grade 5 at Chester Le Junior Public School in Scarborough in the 1980s, Clarke credits that period in his life as his most rewarding experience.

Biography
Clarke worked in the automobile business during the early 1990s. He sought election as Mayor of East York in the 1994 municipal election, describing himself as an "advertising consultant, political rebel and welfare recipient". He promised to resign after three months if elected, and to form a provincial party for ordinary people.

Clarke first campaigned for the Legislative Assembly of Ontario in the 1995 general election, challenging New Democratic Party Premier Bob Rae in York South. He received 170 votes, finishing seventh in a field of nine candidates. During this election, Clarke vowed to oppose the "pimps" of government who "live off the avails of the people".

Clarke campaigned for York South again in 1996 after Rae retired from the legislature, and finished last in a field of six candidates with 70 votes. The winner was Gerard Kennedy of the Ontario Liberal Party.

He sought election to the House of Commons of Canada in the 1997 federal election, and finished sixth out of eight candidates in Broadview—Greenwood with 211 votes. The winner was Dennis Mills of the Liberal Party of Canada. During this election, Clarke described himself as a salesman and a businessman.

He became homeless in 1998 after his auto business failed. For the next seven years, he frequently sang and preached on the streets of Toronto while wearing long, flowing robes. He was also actively involved in public affairs and was a member of the Toronto Disaster Relief Committee.

Clarke ran for the Ontario legislature a third time in a by-election for Beaches—East York on September 20, 2001. He finished sixth out of eight candidates with 94 votes. The winner was Michael Prue of the New Democratic Party.

Clarke campaigned for Mayor of Toronto in the 2000,  2003 and 2006 municipal elections, and ran for Toronto City Council in by-elections held in 1998 and 2001. His primary issues were street and water safety, though he also emphasized anti-drug policies. He ran his 2001 campaign out of a homeless shelter which he used every night. In the 1998 campaign, his age was listed as thirty-four.

He took part in an unusual protest during the 2003 campaign, by tearing up pieces of a telephone book and scattering them to the wind during lunch hour at a busy Toronto intersection. "You care if there's paper on the street," he said to passers-by, "but you don't care if there's people on the street". He also described himself as an "ex-con, ex-drug dealer and ex-teacher".

Clarke finally found housing again in 2005, and worked as an actor during this period.

He was a candidate running for the 2010 Toronto mayoral election. Clarke has been known to employ eccentric tactics to reach the public during his campaign, including speeches while aboard the TTC and rollerblading whilst shouting campaign slogans on the road in Kingston Road and Lawrence Avenue East area.

In the 2011 Ontario election he ran as leader of the People's Political Party.

Kevin Clarke emphatically stated to Peter Tabuns, during an all-candidates debate on education held on September 20, 2011, that he does not endorse the Ontario New Democratic Party.

Clarke ran for mayor in the 2018 election, where he finished with 3,853 votes.

Clarke is known for attending debates and causing a commotion. He was not invited to a debate Toronto Centre By-election in 2013; however, he showed up and began yelling at the Liberal Party candidate Chrystia Freeland and New Democratic Candidate Linda McQuaig.  He was subsequently arrested by the police and the debate was cancelled. Additionally in 2019, he attended a debate on the environment and climate change ahead of the 2019 federal election in Scarborough-Guildwood, where only members of the major political parties were invited. He entered holding a large hand-painted "Vote Kevin Clarke" sign and immediately began yelling and criticizing the debate organizers as well as Liberal Party incumbent candidate John McKay. Upon discussion between the organizers and invited candidates, he was eventually allowed to participate in the debate on the condition he remained orderly.

Clarke ran in the 2020 Toronto Centre federal by-election.

Electoral record

References

External links 

Kevin Clarke's People's Political Party

Independent candidates in the 1997 Canadian federal election
Politicians from Toronto
Independent candidates in Ontario provincial elections
Homeless people
Living people
Ontario municipal politicians
Black Canadian politicians
1964 births